Pottock Creek is a stream in the U.S. state of Mississippi.

Pottock is a name derived from the Choctaw language purported to signify "stream with two branches".

References

Rivers of Mississippi
Rivers of Leake County, Mississippi
Mississippi placenames of Native American origin